The following list includes the tourist attractions on the island of Ireland which attract more than 100,000 visitors annually. It includes attractions in both Northern Ireland and the Republic of Ireland.

Multi-county destinations/routes
 The Wild Atlantic Way
 Ireland's Ancient East
Ireland's Hidden Heartlands

Destinations by county

A to C
Antrim
Antrim Castle and Gardens
Carrick-a-Rede Rope Bridge
Belfast, capital of Northern Ireland, second largest city on the island
Titanic Quarter, including the Titanic Belfast visitor attraction, the SS Nomadic museum ship, and W5 science museum
Ulster Museum within the Botanic Gardens
Dark Hedges
Giant's Causeway, a geological phenomenon and a UNESCO World Heritage Site
Lagan Valley Regional Park
Old Bushmills Distillery, the oldest Irish whiskey distillery in existence
Armagh
Armagh city, ecclesiastical capital of Ireland and home to St Patrick's Cathedral, Armagh (Church of Ireland) and St Patrick's Cathedral, Armagh (Roman Catholic)
Lough Neagh, including Kinnego Marina and Oxford Island National Nature Reserve
Lurgan Park
Slieve Gullion
Carlow
 Altamont House and Gardens
Clare
Bunratty Castle
The Burren, a karst landscape which is home to prehistoric monuments such as Poulnabrone dolmen
Cliffs of Moher
Cork
Blarney, including Blarney Castle the home of the Blarney Stone
Cork City, third largest city in all of Ireland and second city of the Republic of Ireland
Church of St Anne (Shandon)
Crawford Art Gallery
English Market
University College Cork campus
Doneraile Park
Fota Wildlife Park
Kinsale
Midleton, home of the Jameson Distillery and Heritage Center

D
Donegal
Glenveagh National Park, including Glenveagh Castle
Malin Head, most northerly point on the mainland of Ireland
Slieve League sea cliffs
Down
Crawfordsburn Country Park
Dundonald International Ice Bowl, ice rink
Irish linen - Thomas Ferguson & Co Ltd, the last remaining Irish linen damask factory
Kilbroney Park near Rostrevor at the base of the Mourne Mountains
Portstewart Strand
Scrabo Tower and Scrabo Country Park
Tollymore Forest Park
Dublin City, largest city on the island, capital and cultural and economic centre of the Republic of Ireland
Christ Church Cathedral, seat of Anglican Church of Ireland Archbishop of Dublin
Chester Beatty Library
Croke Park, one of Europe's largest stadiums, with the Museum of the Gaelic Athletic Association
Dublin Castle, former seat of British rule, now a major Irish government complex
Dublinia, museum and "historical recreation" attraction
EPIC The Irish Emigration Museum, diaspora museum
General Post Office building, headquarters of the 1916 Easter Rising rebels, on O'Connell Street, the main thoroughfare of Dublin's Northside
Glasnevin Cemetery, burial location of Éamon de Valera, Michael Collins, Roger Casement, and many others
Grafton Street, one of the main shopping streets in Dublin
Ha'penny Bridge, Victorian pedestrian bridge across the River Liffey
Hugh Lane Gallery
Irish Museum of Modern Art
Old Jameson Distillery, Smithfield
Kilmainham Gaol, a former prison where, among others, most of the rebels of 1916 were held and executed; now a museum
National Aquatic Centre, Blanchardstown
National Botanic Gardens, Glasnevin, Dublin (Northside)
National Gallery of Ireland, houses the Irish national collection of Irish and European art
National Library of Ireland, has a large quantity of Irish historical, literary and Irish-related material
National Museum of Ireland for Archaeology (in Kildare St) and Decorative Art and History (in the former Collins Barracks)
Phoenix Park, "largest inner city park in the world"; within the park are Farmleigh Estate and Dublin Zoo
Guinness Storehouse
St Patrick's Cathedral, Dublin, Ireland's "national cathedral"
St Stephen's Green, a landscaped inner-city centre public park in Dublin
Temple Bar, a mainly cobblestonequarter, directly on the Southern banks of the Liffey, popular for its cultural and nightlife spots
Trinity College, Dublin (also called the University of Dublin), Ireland's oldest university, home of the Book of Kells and the Book of Durrow
Dún Laoghaire–Rathdown
DLR Lexicon housing a library and cultural centre

F to K
Fermanagh
Belleek Pottery Visitor Centre
Fingal
Howth and Howth Head
Malahide, with the Norman Malahide Castle
Galway
Aran Islands, Gaeltacht islands in Galway Bay which are the location of Dún Aonghasa
Connemara, Irish Gaeltacht, a heathland area, including Connemara National Park
Galway City, a university city (seat of the NUI Galway)
Kylemore Abbey & Gardens
Kerry, scenic rural county in the south west
Dingle, main town of the Dingle Peninsula and home to the Dingle Oceanworld Aquarium
Killarney
Killarney National Park including Killarney Lakes and Muckross House and Gardens
Ring of Kerry, ring road around the Iveragh Peninsula passing through, among others, the village of Cahersiveen, the birthplace of Daniel O'Connell
Skellig Islands with the monastic site on Skellig Michael, a UNESCO World Heritage Site
Tralee, home of the Rose of Tralee festival and Aqua Dome
Kildare
Castletown House
Kildare town with Kildare Cathedral and nearby Irish National Stud & Japanese Gardens
Newbridge Silverware visitors centre and "Museum of Style Icons"
Kilkenny
Kilkenny City, a medieval city which is home to St Canice's Cathedral, Rothe House, and Kilkenny Castle

L to M
Laois
Emo Court and Parklands
Rock of Dunamase
Limerick
Adare, "Ireland's most beautiful village" with Adare Manor, Desmond Castle, a Franciscan and a Trinitarian abbey
Limerick city, historic Irish city and home to the Munster rugby team, and King John's Castle
Londonderry
City of Derry, only city in Ireland with intact and unbreached city walls (hence sometimes called 'the Maiden City'). The Guildhall, Derry attracted 350,000 visitors in 2017
Roe Valley Country Park
Louth
Carlingford, one of Ireland's best preserved mediaeval towns, on the edge of Carlingford Lough
Drogheda, formerly Ireland's largest walled town (formed when two separate towns united in 1412); site of Laurence's Gat, Millmount Museum in the castle taken by Cromwell in 1649
Mayo
Croagh Patrick, mountain place of pilgrimage from pagan times to the present day, near Westport
Museum of Country Life near Castlebar
Meath
Brú na Bóinne, location of the Knowth, Dowth and Newgrange neolithic tombs and monuments
Hill of Tara, seat of Ireland's ancient High Kings
Emerald Park, theme park
Trim Castle
Monaghan
Harvest Time Blues Festival

O to W
Offaly
Birr Castle, including its gardens and science centre
Clonmacnoise, monastic site on the banks of the River Shannon
Roscommon
Lough Key Lake and forest park
Sligo
Drumcliffe with its church and gravesite of William Butler Yeats, overlooked by Ben Bulben mountain
Sligo town with Sligo Abbey
Tipperary
Holy Cross Abbey, a restored Cistercian monastery
Rock of Cashel, traditional seat of the Kings of Munster
Tyrone
Dungannon Park
Ulster American Folk Park near Omagh
Waterford
Waterford, Ireland's oldest city, home to the Waterford Museum of Treasures (which includes Reginald's Tower and other museum sites, which collectively attracted 100,000 visitors in 2017)
Waterford Greenway, a cycling and hiking trail
Westmeath, centre of Ireland; lakelands
Belvedere House and Gardens, historic gardens near Mullingar
Wexford
Ferns Castle and Abbey
New Ross and the John F Kennedy Arboretum
Wicklow, "the garden of Ireland"
Glendalough, 6th-century monastic site with Irish round tower
Powerscourt Estate, house, grounds and gardens (together with the nearby Powerscourt Waterfall)
Russborough House, an example of Irish Palladian architecture, designed by Richard Cassels, built between 1741 and 1755

See also
Tourism in the Republic of Ireland
List of Ireland-related topics
Common Travel Area
Gardens in the Republic of Ireland
Parks in the Republic of Ireland

References

External links

 Official site of the Republic of Ireland Tourist Board
 Official site of the Northern Ireland Tourist Board
 

 
Tourism in Ireland